Kaye Umansky (born 6 December 1946) is an English children's author and poet. She has written over 130 books for children and her work ranges from picture books to novels. She is best known for the Pongwiffy & Jim Series.

Early life
Kaye Umansky was born in Plymouth, Devon. Her mother was a music teacher and encouraged her to play from a young age and her father was also a teacher who encouraged her reading.

As an only child, Kaye wrote stories and plays, which she tried to get her friends to act in.

After Kaye left school, she went to London to train as a teacher. Kaye enjoyed teaching music, drama and creative writing, but not mathematics. Alongside her husband, Kaye formed a soul band and played in the evenings and at weekends; she says they "never became rich and famous, but we had a lot of fun".

She continued writing as a hobby and began writing full-time when her daughter was born.

Personal life
She lives in North London with her husband Mo, an engineer, they have been together over 30 years. She has a daughter called Ella. She has an extended family of step children and step grandchildren. She got two katen named: Jeremy and Heathcliff.

Career

Umansky got her first children's book published in 1986. The book was a collection of songs for children and was called Phantasmagoria. Kaye still writes music books, along with plays, poems, novels and picture books. But she is best known as the creator of Pongwiffy

She cites Richmal Crompton and Terry Pratchett as two of her biggest literary influences and her style has been compared to that of Roald Dahl and Eva Ibbotson.

In 2008, she was a judge for the inaugural Roald Dahl Funny Prize for humorous children's literature.

Pongwiffy
Originally published  by A & C Black, then in paperback by Penguin Books, the first Pongwiffy book, Pongwiffy: A Witch of Dirty Habits, was published in 1987. They are now published by Bloomsbury Publishing and Pongwiffy's '21st Birthday' was recently celebrated with the release of the seventh title in the series, Pongwiffy: Back on Track.

They have been published in various countries in Europe. They have published as audio books, read by Prunella Scales, and as a cartoon TV series of 13 episodes which was first aired on ITV1 between June & September 2002. Pongwiffy was voiced by Dawn French and Pongwiffy's best friend, Sharkadder, was voiced by Jennifer Saunders.

In 2010 a new Pongwiffy title appeared in a flip-book alongside a story by Phillip Ardagh as one of the official publications for World Book Day.

Bibliography

Pongwiffy Series
Pongwiffy (1987)
Pongwiffy and the Goblin's Revenge / Broom-napped (1990)
Pongwiffy and the Spell of the Year (1992)
Pongwiffy and the Holiday of Doom (1994)
Pongwiffy and the Pantomime (1996)
Pongwiffy and the Spello-vision Song Contest (2003)
Pongwiffy Back On Track (2009)
Pongwiffy and the Important Announcement (2010) — published dos-à-dos with Grubtown Tales: The Great Pasta Disaster
Tales from Witchway Wood: Crash 'n' Bang (2011)

Elsie Pickles Series
Witch for a Week (2017)
Wish for a Witch (2018)
Witches (Un)Welcome (2019)
Witch in Winter (2019)

Clover Twig
 Clover Twig and the Magical Cottage (2009)
 Clover Twig and the  Perilous Path (2010)

The 'Three' Series
A series using traditional stories and music.
Three Singing Pigs (1993)
Three Rapping Rats (1996)
Three Tapping Teddies (1998)
Three Rocking Crocs (2006)

The 'Curtain Up!' Series
Plays written for primary school children, ages 5–12.
Cinderella (1995)
Noah's Ark (1995)
The Emperor's New Clothes (1996)
Sleeping Beauty (2000)
The Snow Queen (2003)

Sir Quinton Quest
The story of an explorer and his faithful long-suffering butler, Muggins who go off on expeditions.
Sir Quinton Quest Hunts the Yeti (1992)
Sir Quinton Quest Hunts the Jewel (1994)
The Yeti Hunts for Sir Quinton! (1993)
The Giant Series
Tales of Waldo the Giant and his beloved, Heavy Hetty. Illustrated by Doffy Weir.
The Romantic Giant (1992)
The Jealous Giant (1995)
The Dressed Up Giant (1998)

The Weirds
Stories about the Weird Family. Illustrated by Chris Mould.
Meet The Weirds (2003)
Weird Happen-ings (2004)
Wildly Weird (2006)

Sophie Rabbit Series
Four stories about a Rabbit called Sophie, Illustrated by Anna Curry.
Sophie and Abigail (1995)
Sophie and the Wonderful Picture (1995)
Sophie and the Mother's Day Card (1995)
Sophie In Charge (1995)

The Quest for 100 Gold Coins Series
A four-part adventure about Nev Niceguy and his quest.
Donkey Ride to Disaster (1998)
Madness in the Mountains (1999)
Strange Days at Sea (2000)
No More Master Niceguy (2000)

Story Street Series
Books which were written for a Literacy Scheme in the UK, for 4-10 year olds.
The Magic Button - 2000
Strange Street Again - 2000
Aha! - 2000
Jojo in the Jungle - 2000
Dinosaur Adventure - 2000
Moon Adventure - 2000
Rope that Cow - 2000
The Missing Shoes - 2000
Pirates Ahoy! - 2000
Clang! - 2000
The Rubbish Monster - 2000
Stop Thief! - 2000
The Carnival - 2000
Beyond Strange Street- 2000
Soup with Obby - 2000
Down the Rushing River - 2000
Wizard Wagoo - 2000
Up the Dizzy Mountain - 2000
Gong! - 2000
Poor Sam - 2000
What a Mess - 2000
I am Miss Cherry - 2000
Pond - 2000
Jumbo - 2000
Sunita and the Wishing Well - 2000

PlayReaders Series
Four short plays.
Bandybones (1986)
Little Sister (1986)
The Toymaker's (1986)
Litter Bugs (1987)

4 Spooky Stories
Four scary stories written in verse, the last is a compilation.
The Night I Was Chased By A Vampire (1994)
The Empty Suit Of Armour (1994)
The Bogey-men and the Trolls Next Door (1994)
The Spooks Step Out (1994)
The Night I Was Chased By A Vampire and other stories (2004)

Nonsense Rhymes
Collections of Rhymes, Illustrated by Chris Fisher.
Nonsense Counting Rhymes (1999)
Nonsense Animal Rhymes (2001)
Nonsense Fairytale Rhymes (2006)
Nonsense Rhymes Collection (three books in one) (2006)

Wilma's Adventures
The stories of Wilma, a Wicked Queen in training.
Wilma's Wicked Revenge (2000)
Wilma's Wicked Spell (2002)

Goblinz
Three stories of a gaggle of Goblins.
Goblinz (2002)
Goblinz Detectives Inc (2004)
Goblinz and the Witch (2005)

Solomon Snow
A mock-Victorian adventure of a young Solomon Snow, his friend Prudence, a six-year-old girl named Rosabella, and don't forget her cute little bunny, Mr. Skippy.
Solomon Snow and the Silver Spoon (2004)
Solomon Snow and the Stolen Jewel (2005)

Jim
Stories told in rhyme for 3-7 year olds.
Pass the Jam, Jim - 1992
You can Swim, Jim - 1997
Need a Trim, Jim - 1999
This is Jane, Jim - 2002
Three Days With Jim - 2001

Buster Gutt
About a Pirate called Buster Gutt and his arch enemy Admiral Ainsley Goldglove.
Buster's Big Surprise - 2003
Buster Gutt - 2003
Buster and the Golden Glove - 2003

Other books
Big Iggy - 1987
Phantas-magoria - 1987
The Snow Queen - 2003
Three Little Nativit-ies - 2006
Let's Go To London - 2007
I Am A Tree - 2006
The Misfortunes of Captain Cadaverous - 1990
Never Meddle With Magic Mirrors - 1993
A Ruby, A Rug and a Prince Called Doug - 1995
Horses' Holiday – 2005
I Want A Pet – 2005
He's Behind You - 2003
Tin Can Hero - 1992
Beyond the Beanstalk - 1997
Hammy House of Horror - 1995
Cruel Times - 2002
Humble Tom's Big Trip - 2002
Tiger and Me - 1991
A Chair For Baby Bear - 2004
Witches In Stitches - 1987
The Fwog Pwince - the Twuth] - 1989
King Keith and the Jolly Lodger - 1990
King Keith and the Nasty Case of Dragonitus - 1988
Do Not Open Before Christmas Day - 1992
Trash Hits - 1990
Tickle My Nose (infant action rhymes) - 1995
Wiggle My Toes (infant action rhymes) - 2000
My Very First Joke Book - 2004
Prince Dandy-pants and the Masked Avenger - 2001
Mick McMenace, Ghost Detective - 2003
Dobbin – 1997
I Don't Like Gloria - 2007

Awards
The 1993 Nottinghamshire Book Award for Pongwiffy and the Spell of the Year; the 1999 Times Educational Supplement Junior Music Book Award for Three Rapping Rats; the 2005 Spoken Word Award for the audio version of The Silver Spoon Of Solomon Snow, read by Rik Mayall.

References

External links
Kaye Umansky's homepage
Pongwiffy Website
Author Page at Bloomsbury Books
Author Page at Penguin Books

English children's writers
Living people
1946 births
Writers from Plymouth, Devon